Eduardo Guerrero (4 March 1928 – 17 August 2015) was an Argentine rower and Olympic champion who competed in the 1952 Summer Olympics.

He was born in Salto, Buenos Aires Province.

Guerrero participated in the 1952 Summer Olympics in Helsinki where he won gold medal in double sculls competition together with Tranquilo Cappozzo. That was for 52 years the last gold medal at Olympics for Argentina until the victories of Soccer and Basketball men teams in 2004 games.

Guerrero died on 17 August 2015 at the age of 87.

References

External links
 

1928 births
2015 deaths
People from Salto Partido
Sportspeople from Buenos Aires Province
Argentine male rowers
Olympic rowers of Argentina
Rowers at the 1952 Summer Olympics
Olympic gold medalists for Argentina
Olympic medalists in rowing
Medalists at the 1952 Summer Olympics